Siddon is a surname. Notable people with the surname include:

Tom Siddon, Canadian politician
Mary Siddon, English thief

See also
Siddons